The Greatest Songs of the Sixties is Barry Manilow's sequel album for The Greatest Songs of the Fifties. The album was another major hit for Manilow in the United States, selling nearly 50% more than his previous album in its opening week. As with its predecessor, this album was produced by Clive Davis, along with Manilow and David Benson. The classics performed in this album includes Frankie Valli's "Can't Take My Eyes Off You", Elvis Presley's #1 hit "Can't Help Falling in Love", Beatles' "And I Love Her" and Frank Sinatra's "Strangers in the Night" (the latter first appeared on Manilow's Sinatra-tribute album Manilow Sings Sinatra in 1998).

US Track listing
"Can't Take My Eyes Off You" – 4:20
"Cherish" / "Windy" (Duet with The Association) – 3:47
"Can't Help Falling in Love" – 3:38
"There's a Kind of Hush" – 3:01
"Blue Velvet" – 2:54
"Raindrops Keep Fallin' on My Head" – 3:02
"And I Love Her" – 2:55
"This Guy's in Love with You" – 4:03
"Everybody Loves Somebody" – 2:56
"You've Lost That Lovin' Feelin'" – 4:04
"When I Fall in Love" – 3:30
"Strangers in the Night" – 3:06
"What the World Needs Now Is Love" – 3:41

UK Track listing
"Can't Take My Eyes Off You" – 4:20
"Cherish" / "Windy" (Duet with The Association) – 3:47
"Can't Help Falling in Love" – 3:38
"There's a Kind of Hush (All Over the World)" – 3:01
"And I Love Her" – 2:55
"Blue Velvet" – 2:54
"Raindrops Keep Falling on My Head" – 3:02
"This Guy's in Love With You" – 4:03
"Everybody Loves Somebody" – 2:56
"You've Lost That Lovin' Feeling" – 4:04
"When I Fall in Love" – 3:30
"Strangers in the Night" – 3:06
"What the World Needs Now Is Love" – 3:41
"California Dreamin'" - 2:47
"Yesterday" - 2:07

Musicians
Contractor: Joe Soldo
Piano: Barry Manilow, Randy Waldman
Guitar: Ken Berry, Mike Lent
Bass: Dave Carpenter
Drums: Russ McKinnon
Percussion: Dan Greco, Paulinho Da Costa
Background Vocals: Randy Crenshaw (Contractor), Ron Dante, Linda Harmon, Walt Harrah, Jon Joyce, Rick Logan, Connie Nassios, Susie Stevens, and Dick Wells
Violins: Assa Drori (Concert Master), Darius Campo, Daphne Chen, Lisa Dondlinger, Sam Fisher, Ron Folsom, Neel Hammond, Ray Kobler, Johanna Krejci, Liane Mautner, Cynthia Moussas, Jennifer Munday, David Stenske, Yan To, Miwako Watanabe, Dynell Weber
Violas: Ken Burward-Hoy, Sam Formicola, Carrie Holzman, Andrew Picken, Harry Shiranian, Ray Tischer
Cello: Larry Corbett, Armen Ksajikian, Dane Little, Timothy Loo, Tina Soule, John Walz
Harp: Gayle Levant, Marcia Dickstein
Saxophones: Gene Cipriano, Gary Foster, Dan Higgins, Greg Huckins, Joe Stone
Flute: Steve Kujala
Trumpets: Wayne Bergeron, Gary Grant, Chris Gray, Warren Leuning
Trombone: Steve Baxter, Craig Gosnell, Charles Loper, Chauncey Welsch
Tuba: Tommy Johnson
French Horn: Mark Adams, Steve Becknell, Paul Klintworth
Music Preparation: Terry Woodson Music, J. Barrick Griffiths, Danny Perito, Yeli Lim, Bill Baker, Curt Berg, Bill Edwards, Gisela Garcia Brugada, Jackie Johnson

Charts

Weekly charts

Year-end charts

Certifications

References

 [ Billboard]

2006 albums
Barry Manilow albums
Albums produced by Clive Davis
Arista Records albums